Kate Grant is an American nonprofit leader and writer.  She is the founding CEO of Fistula Foundation, a global nonprofit organization that provides surgical treatment for the childbirth injury obstetric fistula. She has led the organization from supporting one hospital in Ethiopia to being the clear global leader in obstetric fistula treatment. Fistula Foundation funds more fistula surgeries than any organization in the world; their goal is to eliminate the suffering caused by the injury, which untreated leaves women incontinent and too frequently social outcasts. An estimated one million women suffer from fistula worldwide, and due to a global shortage in awareness and funding, fewer than 20,000 are treated each year. Under Ms. Grant's leadership, Fistula Foundation has raised more than $84 million and supported treatment in 33 countries. Fistula Foundation is a recommended charity of ethicist Peter Singer's The Life You Can Save. In addition, it has earned 16 consecutive 4-star ratings from Charity Navigator, and an A rating from Charity Watch.

Early life and education
Kate Grant was born in the U.S., the eldest of four children; her father was an award-winning research scientist with NASA at Ames Research Center in Mountain View, California, and her mother an elementary school teacher and later administrator at Zilog; she was raised in Sunnyvale, California. She earned a BS from the University of California at Berkeley,  graduating with honors from the Haas School of Business, and earned a Master in Public Affairs from the Woodrow Wilson School at Princeton University, now called the Princeton School of Public and International Affairs, with a focus on International Development.

Career 
Grant started her career with the advertising agency, Leo Burnett, in Chicago, as part of their account management training program, and then joined Foote, Cone and Belding (FCB) in San Francisco, rising to Account Director. She managed multi-million dollar accounts for clients such as Levi Strauss, McDonald's and Clorox, but an extended seven-month trip through developing countries in north Africa and Asia on a leave of absence from FCB changed her career trajectory dramatically. Grant left her advertising career to pursue a career to help eliminate global poverty.

During graduate school she worked in Dar es Salaam, Tanzania, and in Dakar, Senegal, on aid projects. After graduating from Princeton, Grant served on the US House of Representatives Foreign Affairs Committee staff, for then chairman Lee Hamilton, with a policy portfolio including Population, Health and Gender Issues.  From there, she went to USAID, serving as the Deputy Chief of Staff and Special Assistant to USAID Director, Brian Atwood, and was a member of the United States delegation to the 1995 United Nations Women's Conference in Beijing, China, as well as the 1994 United Nations Cairo Conference on Population and Development. She also served as a consultant to International AIDS Vaccine Initiative, the Rockefeller Foundation, the Women's Funding Network and the USAID Mission in Dar es Salaam, Tanzania, and as Vice President of Nonprofit Programs at Network for Good.

In 2004, Grant joined the board of Fistula Foundation, and in 2005 was appointed as its first CEO. She's led the Foundation from a focus on one hospital in one country, the Addis Ababa Fistula Hospital in Ethiopia, to a global operation, having supported programs in 33 countries. The Foundation has offices in San Jose, California, Nairobi, Kenya and Mansa, Zambia. She's formed key partnerships with corporate leaders Johnson & Johnson and Astellas Pharma EMEA. She's the architect of a pathbreaking program in Kenya, Action on Fistula, creating the first dedicated fistula treatment network throughout the country. The program will soon completed its second phase, treating double the number of women the program initially set out to treat, as reported by Reuters. In addition, Grant has built partnerships with key NGO leaders, such as the International Federation of Gynecology and Obstetrics —the organization that developed the Global Competency-Based Fistula Surgery Training Manual—  and the United Nations Population Fund (UNFPA) to launch the Global Fistula Map.

Grant has also formed partnerships with high-profile individuals that have supported Fistula Foundation in a number of ways. Pulitzer Prize-winning journalist Nicholas Kristof has written numerous articles highlighting obstetric fistula in his New York Times column. On October 1, 2019, on his 35th anniversary with the paper, he mentioned fistula as one of the most important issues to him personally in his career at the Times, and Fistula Foundation as the organization "now playing a major role." He also included Fistula Foundation his 2009 book Half the Sky, co-authored with Sheryl WuDunn. Fistula Foundation was included in a PBS documentary based on the book, as well as a 2012 campaign, Half the Sky Movement. This campaign included a Facebook-based game called Half the Game, where players helped unlock $250,000 in donations to Fistula Foundation by completing actions in the game.

Renowned ethicist and Princeton professor Peter Singer has recommended Fistula Foundation through his book The Life You Can Save and organization of the same name. The organization recommends and raises funds for 22 top charities, including Fistula Foundation, that work to improve the lives of people living in extreme poverty. In 2015, Grammy Award-winning musician Paul Simon put on a private concert in New York City to support Fistula Foundation through The Life You Can Save. In 2019, Singer and Simon highlighted Fistula Foundation's effectiveness in a segment on CBS News.

In 2005, Oprah Winfrey aired a segment on Fistula Foundation's work at the time supporting the Addis Ababa Fistula Hospital. Comedian Louis CK has long been a public supporter of Fistula Foundation, choosing the charity as the recipient of his winning Power Players Jeopardy! appearance and wearing a Fistula Foundation t-shirt as host of Saturday Night Live on April 8, 2017.

In 2014, the American Marketing Association (AMA) awarded Grant the Nonprofit Marketer of the Year award. She was the eighth nonprofit executive to receive this honor in the AMA's history. And, in July 2017, she participated in the Harvard Business School Executive Education program, “Strategic Perspectives in Nonprofit Management."

Writing and public speaking 
Grant also appears in the media frequently, having been interviewed by Reuters, Newsweek, Chronicle of Philanthropy, USA Today, the Silicon Valley Business Journal, Nasdaq, Africa54, Women in the World, The Good News Network, The Guardian, The Times, SF Gate, and Voice of America. In 2019, she was featured in two podcasts: The Life You Can Save and The Austin Meyer Podcast.

Grant's work has been published in the New York Times, The Lancet. the London Economic Forum, Global Citizen, and more. She is also a frequent contributor to the Huffington Post and Medium.  She presented at her alma mater, Princeton University, in 2015 at the Center for Health and Wellbeing. She has also spoken at public events such as the Effective Altruism Global conference at Oxford University and Q Commons in Oakland, California.

References

Living people
Year of birth missing (living people)